Hubbard Township is one of the twenty-four townships of Trumbull County, Ohio, United States.  The 2000 census found 14,304 people in the township, 6,020 of whom lived in the unincorporated portions of the township.

Geography
Located in the southeastern corner of the county, it borders the following townships and cities:
Brookfield Township – north
Hermitage, Pennsylvania – northeast
Shenango Township, Mercer County, Pennsylvania – east
Coitsville Township, Mahoning County – south
Youngstown – southwest
Liberty Township – west
Vienna Township – northwest corner

The city of Hubbard is located in central Hubbard Township, and the census-designated places of Maplewood Park and Masury are located in the township's south and northeast respectively.

Name and history
Hubbard Township was established around 1806, deriving its name from Nehemiah Hubbard, Jr., a Connecticut Land Company agent. It is the only Hubbard Township statewide.

Government
The township is governed by a three-member board of trustees, who are elected in November of odd-numbered years to a four-year term beginning on the following January 1. Two are elected in the year after the presidential election and one is elected in the year before it. There is also an elected township fiscal officer, who serves a four-year term beginning on April 1 of the year after the election, which is held in November of the year before the presidential election. Vacancies in the fiscal officership or on the board of trustees are filled by the remaining trustees.

References

External links
County website

Townships in Trumbull County, Ohio
Townships in Ohio